Salehabad (also Romanized as Şāleḩābād and Şālehābād) is a village in Tarand Rural District, Jalilabad District, Pishva County, Tehran Province, Iran. At the 2006 census, its population was 172, in 36 families.

References 

Populated places in Pishva County